"Life Is a Rollercoaster" is a song by Irish singer-songwriter Ronan Keating from his debut solo album, Ronan (2000). The song was written and produced by New Radicals frontman Gregg Alexander, and Rick Nowels, having originally been intended for the second New Radicals album which never came to fruition due to Alexander's decision to break up the band. The opening refrain of the song is similar to that of a leaked Alexander song, "A Love Like That", suggesting that parts of the song were incorporated in Keating's song.

"Life Is a Rollercoaster" was released on 10 July 2000 in the United Kingdom. The song debuted at number one in the UK and Ireland, becoming Keating's second number-one single in both countries. In the UK, where the song was subject to a charting controversy, it became the 22nd-biggest-selling single of the year, and it has been certified platinum by the British Phonographic Industry (BPI) for sales and streams exceeding 600,000 units. Worldwide, "Life Is a Rollercoaster" topped the music charts of the Czech Republic, Denmark, and Iceland and peaked within the top 10 in an additional nine countries.

Release and controversy
In the United Kingdom, Polydor Records released "Life Is a Rollercoaster" on 10 July 2000 across three formats: an enhanced CD single, a limited-edition CD single, and a cassette single. The original version of the enhanced CD contains two B-sides—"Since 13" and "You"—as well as a CD-ROM interview with Ronan Keating. This caused an issue when the Chart Supervisory Committee (CSC) ruled the format ineligible to chart, discarding about 100,000 copies of the single that had already been sold.

Under the previous chart regulations, the enhanced section of a CD had to contain an enhanced version of an audio track that was on the same disc, to which CD1 of "Life Is a Rollercoaster" did not comply. As a result, more pressings of the limited-edition CD were created while a new enhanced CD was rush-released. This incident caused the CSC to add new rules regarding multimedia formats, which came into effect in late August 2000. On its second week of release, the ineligible CD sold about 14,000 more copies during the first half of the week, which would have given "Life Is a Rollercoaster" a second week at number one on the UK Singles Chart.

Track listings

UK CD1 (original)
 "Life Is a Rollercoaster" (radio edit)
 "Since 13"
 "You" (radio edit)
 Interview (CD-ROM)

UK CD1 (re-issue) and Australian CD single
 "Life Is a Rollercoaster" (radio edit)
 "Life Is a Rollercoaster" (instrumental version)
 "Thank God I Kissed You"
 "When You Say Nothing at All" (acoustic version)
 "Life Is a Rollercoaster" (CD-ROM video)

UK CD2
 "Life Is a Rollercoaster" (radio edit)
 "Life Is a Rollercoaster" (karaoke version)
 "Thank God I Kissed You"

UK 7-inch and cassette single
 "Life Is a Rollercoaster" (radio edit)
 "Since 13"

Credits and personnel
Credits are taken from the Ronan album booklet.

Studios
 Recorded at Fredonia International Studios and Track Record (Hollywood, California)
 Mixed at Larrabee Studios (West Hollywood, California)
 Mastered at 777 Productions (London, England)

Personnel

 Gregg Alexander – writing, production
 Rick Nowels – writing, backing vocals, piano, keyboards, synthesizers, production
 Danielle Brisebois – backing vocals, Pro Tools editing
 Yvonne Williams – backing vocals
 Jackie Smiley – backing vocals
 Sue Ann Carwell – backing vocals
 Rusty Anderson – guitars
 John Pierce – bass guitar
 Charles Judge – piano, keyboards, synthesizers
 Free – Pro Tools editing
 Paula J. Jones – recording
 Randy Wine – recording
 Dave Way – mixing
 Wayne Rodrigues – programming
 Colleen Donahue-Reynolds – production coordination
 Arun Chakraverty – mastering

Charts

Weekly charts

Year-end charts

Certifications

References

2000 singles
2000 songs
Irish Singles Chart number-one singles
Number-one singles in the Czech Republic
Number-one singles in Denmark
Number-one singles in Iceland
Number-one singles in Scotland
Polydor Records singles
Ronan Keating songs
Song recordings produced by Gregg Alexander
Song recordings produced by Rick Nowels
Songs written by Gregg Alexander
Songs written by Rick Nowels
UK Singles Chart number-one singles